BFMC may refer to:

Black Foreign Mission Convention, one of three precursor conventions that merged to form the National Baptist Convention, USA, Inc.
Boozefighters Motorcycle Club
Battlefield 2: Modern Combat